Oscarville is a census-designated place (CDP) in Bethel Census Area, Alaska, United States. The population was 70 at the 2010 census, up from 61 in 2000.

Geography
Oscarville is located at  (60.721274, -161.768440).

Demographics

Oscarville first reported on the 1940 U.S. Census as an unincorporated native village. In 1980, it was made a census-designated place (CDP).

As of the census of 2000, there were 61 people, 15 households, and 12 families residing in the CDP. There were 20 housing units at an average density of 13.3/sq mi (5.1/km2). The racial makeup of the CDP was 0.00% White, 98.36% Native American, and 1.64% from two or more races.

There were 15 households, out of which 53.3% had children under the age of 18 living with them, 66.7% were married couples living together, 6.7% had a female householder with no husband present, and 20.0% were non-families. 20.0% of all households were made up of individuals, and none had someone living alone who was 65 years of age or older. The average household size was 4.07 and the average family size was 4.58.

In the CDP, the population was spread out, with 42.6% under the age of 18, 6.6% from 18 to 24, 27.9% from 25 to 44, 14.8% from 45 to 64, and 8.2% who were 65 years of age or older. The median age was 25 years. For every 100 females, there were 110.3 males. For every 100 females age 18 and over, there were 133.3 males.

The median income for a household in the CDP was $8,125, and the median income for a family was $16,250. Males had a median income of $24,375 versus $0 for females. The per capita income for the CDP was $5,824. There were 50.0% of families and 40.0% of the population living below the poverty line, including 18.8% of under eighteens and 100.0% of those over 64.

Education
Lower Kuskokwim School District operates the Qugcuun Memorial School, K-12.  the school had 13 students. It is a bilingual English-Yup'ik school.

References

Census-designated places in Alaska
Census-designated places in Bethel Census Area, Alaska
Census-designated places in Unorganized Borough, Alaska